Qaleh Jiq-e Bozorg (also Romanized as Qal‘eh Jīq-e Bozorg and Qal‘eh-ye Jīq Bozorg; also known as Qal‘eh Chīq Bozorg, Qal‘eh Jīn-e Bozorg, and Qal’eh Jīq-e-Bālā) is a village in Jafarbay-ye Sharqi Rural District, Gomishan District, Torkaman County, Golestan Province, Iran. At the 2006 census, its population was 1,111, in 233 families.

References 

Populated places in Torkaman County